Saroj (Sanskrit: सरोज) is a Surname used by Pasi community. they also known as Hindu, It is a generic title which variously means lótus, or chaste. they commonly found in India.

Notable people with the surname 
Bholanath Saroj is an Indian politician and member of the 17th Lok Sabha from 2019, representing Machhlishahr constituency, Uttar Pradesh.

Daroga Prasad Saroj (born 1956), Indian politician for the Lalganj (Lok Sabha Constituency) in Uttar Pradesh
Sarju Prasad Saroj, Indian politician belonging to the Janata Dal
Sushila Saroj, member of the 15th Lok Sabha of India

 Tufani Saroj (born 1956), Indian politician for the Saidpur (Lok Sabha constituency) in Uttar Pradesh

 Vinod Saroj (Born 1 July 1980) is an Indian politician from Bela Pratapgarh, India

Kalpana Saroj, female Indian entrepreneur

Santosh Saroj, Bollywood screenwriter and dialogue writer

Shiv Kumar Saroj, announcer with the Hindi Service of Radio Ceylon

 Ajay Kumar Saroj (born 1 May 1997) is an Indian middle-distance runner. He won gold medals in the 1500 m event at the 2016 South Asian Games and the 2017 Asian Athletics Championships.

See also
Pasi (surname)